A myriad (from Ancient Greek ) is technically the number 10,000 (ten thousand); in that sense, the term is used in English almost exclusively for literal translations from Greek, Latin or Sinospheric languages (Chinese, Japanese, Korean, and Vietnam), or when talking about ancient Greek numerals.

More generally, a myriad may be used in colloquial vernaculars to imply an indefinitely large number.

History

The Aegean numerals of the Minoan and Mycenaean civilizations included a single unit to denote tens of thousands. It was written with a symbol composed of a circle with four dashes 𐄫.

In Classical Greek numerals, a myriad was written as a capital mu: Μ, as lower case letters did not exist in Ancient Greece. To distinguish this numeral from letters, it was sometimes given an overbar: . Multiples were written above this sign, so that for example  would equal 4,582×10,000 or 45,820,000. The etymology of the word myriad itself is uncertain: it has been variously connected to PIE *meu- ("damp") in reference to the waves of the sea and to Greek myrmex ("ant") in reference to their swarms.

The largest number named in Ancient Greek was the myriad myriad (written ) or hundred million. In his Sand Reckoner, Archimedes of Syracuse used this quantity as the basis for a numeration system of large powers of ten, which he used to count grains of sand.

Usage
In English, myriad is most commonly used to mean "some large but unspecified number". It may be either an adjective or a noun: both "there are myriad people outside" and "there is a myriad of people outside" are in use. (There are small differences: the former could imply that it is a diverse group of people; the latter does not usually but could possibly indicate a group of exactly ten thousand.) The Merriam-Webster Dictionary notes that confusion over the use of myriad as a noun "seems to reflect a mistaken belief that the word was originally and is still properly only an adjective ... however, the noun is in fact the older form, dating to the 16th century. The noun myriad has appeared in the works of such writers as Milton (plural 'myriads') and Thoreau ('a myriad of'), and it continues to occur frequently in reputable English."

"Myriad" is also infrequently used in English as the specific number 10,000. Owing to the possible confusion with the generic meaning of "large quantity", however, this is generally restricted to translation of other languages like ancient Greek, Chinese, and Hindi where numbers may be grouped into sets of 10,000 (myriads). Such use permits the translator to remain closer to the original text and avoid repeated and unwieldy mentions of "tens of thousands": for example, "the original number of the crews supplied by the several nations I find to have been twenty-four myriads" and "What is the distance between one bridge and another? Twelve myriads of parasangs".

Europe
Most European languages include variations of "myriad" with similar meanings to the English word.

Additionally, the prefix myria- indicating multiplication times ten thousand (×104), was part of the original metric system adopted by France in 1795.

In Modern Greek, the word "myriad" is rarely used to denote 10,000, but a million is ekatommyrio (lit. 'hundred myriad') and a thousand million is disekatommyrio (lit. 'twice hundred myriad').

Asia

In East Asia, the traditional numeral systems of China, Korea, and Japan are all decimal-based but grouped into ten thousands rather than thousands. The pronunciation varies within China and abroad: wàn (Mandarin), wan5 (Hakka), bān (Minnan), maan6 (Cantonese), man (Japanese and Korean), vạn (Vietnamese), and ម៉ឺន meun (Khmer). 

Conversely, Chinese, Japanese, and Korean generally do not have native words for powers of one thousand: what is called "one million" in English is "100" (100 myriad) in the Sinosphere, and "one billion" in English is "" (ten myllion) or "" (ten myriad myriad) in the Sinosphere. Similarly, the PRC government has adapted the word  to mean the scientific prefix mega-, but transliterations are used instead for giga-, tera-, and other larger prefixes. This has caused confusion in areas closely related to the PRC such as Hong Kong and Macau, where  is still largely used to mean 10,0003.

A similar term is the Old Turkic word tümän, whose variant forms remain in use for "ten thousand" among modern Mongolian, Turkish.  According to Sir Gerard Clauson (1891–1974), it was likely borrowed from Tokharian, which may have been borrowed in turn from Old Chinese.

See also

Indian numbering system, which includes the lakh (10 myriad)
-yllion, a proposed system which uses the myriad as one of its basic number names
Tumen (unit), Turkic for "myriad"
Names of large numbers
Power of 10

References

Integers
Units of amount
10000 (number)